The Russian Women's Football Championship, also known as the Top Division and the Women's Football League, is the highest professional  women's football league in Russia.

The Top Division was founded in 1992. Prior to the collapse of the Soviet Union, the women's league played two seasons in 1990 and 1991.

Format
For the 2010 season the seven teams play each other four times, two times away and two games at home. In previous years the team played each other only twice. As Russia is in the top 8 leagues of Europe by UEFA Coefficient the top two teams qualify for the UEFA Women's Champions League and the last team gets relegated to the Women’s 1.Division. The 2011–12 season was the first to last over the winter month. Eight teams contest the season and play each other four times for a total of 28 matches.
The tie-breaking rules after the season are in descending order: points, number of wins, then in matches between tied teams: points, wins, goal difference, goals scored, away goals scored, after that in all matches: goal difference, goals scored, away goal scored, better fair-play record and finally the tie is broken by drawing of a lot. One exception is, if there is a tie of points involving the first place, thus the tie-breaking would determine the champion. In this case, there is an additional match, or in case of at least a three way tie a tournament to be played.

In the 2012–13 season a championship and relegation round was played after the regular season. After 14 matches each, the top four and bottom four teams played each other twice more. The winner of the championship round is the champion.

In 2013 the league returned to the spring-autumn format. No championship group was played then. In 2014 a championship group followed the regular season. Points of both stages are added together.

Teams in the 2022 season

Champions and top scorers

The champions so far are:

Performance by club

See also
 Women's football in Russia

References

External links
 
 League at UEFA
 women.soccerway.com
 womenfootball.ru

 
W
Championship
Top level women's association football leagues in Europe
National championships in Russia
Sports leagues established in 1992
1992 establishments in Russia